Charles R. Greco (1873-1962) was an American architect who worked in the Boston area during the first half of the 20th century. He was educated in the Cambridge public school system and studied architecture at the Lawrence Scientific School of Harvard. Upon graduation he worked with the architectural firms of Wait & Cutter from 1893 to 1899, and Peabody & Stearns from 1900 to 1907, before starting his own practice. 

Greco designed numerous religious buildings for both Roman Catholic and Jewish congregations in Massachusetts, Florida, and Ohio. He also provided the designs for many buildings for the city of Cambridge, Massachusetts, including several fire stations.

Works 

In Massachusetts

145 State Street, Springfield, Massachusetts
Blessed Sacrament Church Cambridge, Massachusetts
Blessed Sacrament Church, Jamaica Plain, Massachusetts
Cambridge Theatre, Cambridge, Massachusetts
Charles Bulfinch School, Boston, Massachusetts
27 Sheffield West, Winchester, Massachusetts
Elks Temple, Cambridge, Massachusetts
Our Lady of Pity Church, Cambridge, Massachusetts (now Reservoir Church)
Sacred Heart Church, Middleboro, Massachusetts
St. Mary's Church, Quincy, Massachusetts
St. Matthew's Church, Dorchester, Massachusetts
St. Patrick's Church, Brockton, Massachusetts
Temple Emanuel, Worcester, Massachusetts
Thorndike School, Cambridge, Massachusetts
Wyeth Square Fire Station, Cambridge, Massachusetts
Central Square Post Office, Cambridge, Massachusetts
Lyman Terrace Housing Project, Holyoke, Massachusetts
Malden District Court, Malden, Massachusetts
Central Fire Station Malden, Massachusetts

Elsewhere

Temple on the Heights, Cleveland Heights, Ohio
Temple Tifereth-Israel, Cleveland, Ohio (now Maltz Performing Arts Center)
Congregation Beth Israel, 701 Farmington Ave, West Hartford, Connecticut
Temple Emanuel Miami Beach, Florida (with Albert Anis)
Harvey S. Firestone Jr. Estate, Twin Oaks Drive, Akron, Ohio (with Edward Reed)
 St. John the Baptist Church, Brunswick, Maine

External links 

Information on St. Mary Church

1873 births
1963 deaths
19th-century American architects
Architects of Roman Catholic churches
Harvard School of Engineering and Applied Sciences alumni
20th-century American architects